Balchen Glacier is a crevassed glacier in Antarctica, flowing west to Block Bay between the Phillips Mountains and the Fosdick Mountains in Marie Byrd Land. It was discovered on December 5, 1929, by the Byrd Antarctic Expedition and named by Richard E. Byrd for Bernt Balchen, chief pilot of the expedition.

See also
 List of glaciers in the Antarctic
 Glaciology

Further reading 
 United States. Defense Mapping Agency. Hydrographic Center, Sailing Directions for Antarctica: Includes Islands South of Latitude 60°, P 262

References

 

Glaciers of Marie Byrd Land